Mohammad Ahle Shakheh is an Iranian football defender who plays for Sanat Naft in the Persian Gulf Pro League.

Club career

Foolad
Ahleh Shakheh started his career with Foolad, from youth levels. He promoted to Foolad first team in summer 2014 by Dragan Skočić and signed three-years contract which keeping him until 2017 at Foolad. He made his professional debut against Zob Ahan on September 15, 2015 as a starter.

Tractor
On 12 June 2018, Ahleh Shakheh signed a 3 years contract with Tractor.

Club career statistics

References

External links
 Mohammad Ahle Shakheh at IranLeague.ir

Mohammad Ahle Shakheh  at bulinews.com

Mohammad Ahle Shakheh at PersianLeague.com

1993 births
Living people
Iranian footballers
Foolad FC players
Tractor S.C. players
Machine Sazi F.C. players
Sanat Naft Abadan F.C. players
Association football defenders
People from Ahvaz
Sportspeople from Khuzestan province